Hanyu may refer to:
Hànyǔ, the Chinese name for the main Chinese language or language of the Han people
Hanyu pinyin, the official romanization system for Standard Chinese in mainland China and to some extent in Taiwan and Singapore
Hanyū, Saitama, a city in Saitama, Japan

People
Han Yu (韓愈, 768–824), ancient Chinese essayist
, Japanese gymnast
Naotake Hanyu (羽生 直剛, born 1979), Japanese footballer
Yuzuru Hanyu (羽生 結弦, born 1994), Japanese figure skater

Japanese-language surnames